Cnemaspis roticanai, also known as the roti canai rock gecko, is a species of gecko endemic to the island of Langkawi, off the west coast of Peninsular Malaysia. It is named after roti canai, Malaysian flat bread.

References

roticanai
Reptiles of Malaysia
Endemic fauna of Malaysia
Reptiles described in 2010
Taxa named by Larry Lee Grismer